Sámuel Joensen-Mikines (1906–1979) was a Faroese painter. He was the first recognised painter of the Faroe Islands and one of the Faroe Islands' most important artists. Many of his paintings have been displayed on Faroese stamps.

Gallery

Sources
The Faroe Islands Art Museum
http://arthistory.heindorffhus.dk/frame-JoensenMikines.htm

1906 births
1979 deaths
20th-century Faroese painters